The Chinese francolin (Francolinus pintadeanus) or Burmese francolin is a species of game bird in the family Phasianidae.

Description
Females are slightly smaller than males.

Distribution and habitat
This species is found in Cambodia, China, India, Laos, Myanmar, Philippines, Thailand, and Vietnam. Introduced to Mauritius, the Philippines, Madagascar, United States, Chile and Argentina. Its natural habitats are subtropical or tropical dry forest and subtropical or tropical moist lowland forest.

References

Chinese francolin
Birds of China
Birds of Hainan
Birds of Southeast Asia
Chinese francolin
Taxonomy articles created by Polbot